Ramasamudra is a panchayat village in the southern state of Karnataka, India. Administratively, Ramasamudra is under Yadgir Taluka of Yadgir District in Karnataka.  The village of Ramasamudra is 6 km by road east of the village of Munderga, and 8.6 km by road west of the village of Paspool.  The nearest railhead is in Yadgir.

There are two villages in the gram panchayat: Ramasamudra and Ashinal.

Demographics 
At the 2001 census, the village of Ramasamudra had 4,369 inhabitants, with 2,199 males and 2,170 females.

Notes

External links 
 

Villages in Yadgir district